The Robert H. Goddard Library is the primary library of Clark University in Worcester, Massachusetts, United States. The library was named after rocketeer Robert H. Goddard, who earned a M.A. and Ph.D. at Clark in the 1910s. The building was built in 1969 and remodeled in 2009. The brick and concrete building was designed by architect John M. Johansen in the Brutalist style.

Dedication
Two months before the opening of the library, Willard Rockwell's Rockwell Foundation gave 75,000 dollars towards the establishment of a periodical room in the library. On May 19, 1969, United States Senator Ted Kennedy of Massachusetts opened the Goddard Library in which he called for the shifting of resources used in aerospace exploration to "pressing problems here at home". Also in attendance at the dedication were John Leland Atwood, president of Rockwell International; library architect John M. Johansen; astronaut Buzz Aldrin; and Goddard's widow Esther Goddard. Aldrin was honored with an honorary degree at the dedication ceremony.

Fifty years later, on March 13, 2019, Clark University commemorated the anniversary of the building's opening, and paid tribute to namesake Robert H. Goddard, with an evening of lectures by Clark administrators and distinguished guests.

Academic Commons at Goddard Library
The Academic Commons at Goddard Library is a study space opened in January 2009 as part of the building's renovations. It includes Clark's primary computer lab, a cafe and study space.

Collections and features
The Dr. Robert H. Goddard Collection and the Robert Goddard Exhibition Room are housed in the Archives and Special Collections area of the library. Outside the library lies a structure depicting the flight path of Goddard's first liquid fuel rocket. In 2008, the library digitized Goddard's collection through a 40,000 dollar grant from the federal Institute of Museum and Library Services.

References

External links
 Goddard Library Official Site

Clark University
Libraries in Worcester, Massachusetts
Library buildings completed in 1969
University and college academic libraries in the United States
Modernist architecture in Massachusetts
Brutalist architecture in Massachusetts
University and college buildings completed in 1969
1969 establishments in Massachusetts